The Udimskaya narrow-gauge railway is located in Arkhangelsk Oblast, Russia. The forest railway was opened in 1938 and currently operates year-round.

Current status 
The Udimskaya forestry railway first line narrow-gauge railway emerged in the 1938, in the area of Kotlassky District, Arkhangelsk Oblast from the village Udimsky. The railway operates scheduled freight services from Udimsky, used for forestry tasks for transportation of felled logs and forestry workers. In 2009, completed construction of a new locomotive depot.

Rolling stock

Locomotives 
 TU6D – No. 0336
 TU6A – No. 2313, 3076, 3078, 3146, 3271, 3438, 3487, 3841
 TU8 – No. 0323
 TD-5U "Pioneer"

Railroad car 
 Boxcar
 Tank car
 Snowplow
 Dining car
 Passenger car
 Railway log-car and flatcar
 Hopper car to transport track ballast

Gallery

See also
Narrow-gauge railways in Russia

References

External links

 Ilim Group
 Photo – project Steam Engine 
 Udimskaya railway (interactive map)

750 mm gauge railways in Russia
Railway lines opened in 1938
Rail transport in Arkhangelsk Oblast
Logging railways in Russia